Kitchener—Conestoga (formerly known as Kitchener—Wilmot—Wellesley—Woolwich) is a federal electoral district in Ontario, Canada, that has been represented in the House of Commons of Canada since 2004. Its population in 2021 was 107,134. The riding is currently represented by Liberal MP Tim Louis. In the 2019 election, this is one of only two ridings in the country in which the Liberal candidate unseated the Conservative incumbent (the other being Milton).

Geography
The district includes the townships of Woolwich, Wellesley and Wilmot, and the southwestern part of the City of Kitchener, i.e., the part of the City of Kitchener lying west of Fischer-Hallman Road.

The electoral district was created in 2003 from Waterloo—Wellington, part of Kitchener Centre, and part of Cambridge. It was known as "Kitchener—Wilmot—Wellesley—Woolwich" from 2004 to 2005.

This riding lost almost half of its territory to Kitchener South—Hespeler but gained territory from Kitchener Centre, Kitchener—Waterloo and a fraction from Wellington—Halton Hills during the 2012 electoral redistribution.

Members of Parliament

Election results

References

Riding history from the Library of Parliament
2011 Results from Elections Canada
 Campaign expense data from Elections Canada

Notes

Ontario federal electoral districts
Politics of Kitchener, Ontario
Woolwich, Ontario